Pennies for Pakistan is a term several different organizations have used at different times for programs to raise humanitarian or educational aid for Pakistan.

Organisations
These organizations include:
Washington Homemakers Council, Washington State,1956
Westside Elementary School, River Falls, Wisconsin, 1995 
Green Acres School, Hamilton Ontario, Canada, 2005 
Glenshaw Valley Presbyterian Church, Pittsburgh PA, 2006 
Central High School, Macon, GA 2008
Quay Primary School, Bridlington, UK, 2010

See also
Pennies for Peace

References

Categories

Foreign aid to Pakistan